Bergen is a rural locality in the Toowoomba Region, Queensland, Australia.

Neuve is a neighbourhood in the south-west of the locality.

Geography 
Neuve is a neighbourhood within the south-west of locality. It takes its name from a former railway station.

History
The Haden railway line from Kingsthorpe to Goobungee and Haden opened in 1910 with Bergen being served by a station called Bergenside.

In 1914 a cemetery was established, operated by a group of trustees. The cemetery had separate sections for a number of religious denominations (Anglican, Roman Catholic, Lutheran, Presbyterian, Methodist and Baptist) and a general section. In 1982 responsibility for the cemetery was given to the Crows Nest Shire Council, and became the responsibility of the Toowoomba Regional Council following the local government amalgamations in 2008.

During World War I, due to anti-German sentiment, the Rosalie Shire Council (headquartered at Goombungee) requested that the Bergenside railway station be renamed. On 14 August 1916 the Queensland Railways Department renamed it Neuve after Neuve Chapelle in France where the Battle of Neuve Chapelle had taken place in March 1915.

Bergen Provisional School opened on 3 August 1896. On  20 January 1902 it became Bergen State School. It closed on 31 December 1969. It was on Gomoran Bergen Road (approx ).

The Haden railway line closed in 1964.

Education 
There are no schools in Bergen. The nearest primary schools are Haden State School in neighbouring Haden to the north-west and Goobungee State School in neighbouring Goombungee to the south-west. For secondary education, the nearest schools are Crows Nest State School (to Year 10) in Crows Nest to the east and Highfields State College (to Year 12) in Highfields to the south.

Amenities 
The Bergen Djuan Cemetery is on Bergen Road (corner Menkins Road). It is operated by the Toowoomba Regional Council.

References 

Toowoomba Region
Localities in Queensland